The 2013 AIM Malaysian Indian were held on 12 October 2013 at the Setia City Convention Centre, Shah Alam, Selangor. Marking the debut and first instalment of the award show. The inaugural AIM Malaysian-Indian music awards show, sponsored by the Ministry of Information, Communications & Culture (MICC). The award is to recognise and honouring Malaysian based Indian artist talents.

The awards nominations are open to albums, singles and music videos released in Malaysia during the period from 1 January 2010 to 31 December 2012 except for the category of Best New Artiste which is only for first album/single released during the period from 1 January 2012 to 31 December 2012. The award show were telecast on Astro Vaanavil.

Nominees and winners
Winners are listed first and highlighted in bold.
{| class=wikitable style="width="150%"
|-
! style="background:#FFFF99;" ! style="width="50%" | Best New Artist
! style="background:#FFFF99;" ! style="width="50%" | Best Vocal Performance in a Song (Male)
|-
|
 Vinesh Kumar – Thanimaiyil (Single)
 Ashtaka – Let's Get It Together (Album: Ashtaka)
 Hashmitha Selvam - Indru Vaazhnthidalaam (Single)
 Subrah G – Vennigam (Album: Love Signature)
 Thyivya Kalaiselvan  – Inni Vendham (Single)
|
 Dhilip Varman – Mazhaiye Mazhaiye
 Dhilip Varman – Vizhigal Seruma
 Jay – Enggo Tulainthavan
 Siddarthan – Theende Thheende
 Vinod Kumar – Antha Nimidham
|-
!style="background:#FFFF99;" ! style="width="50%" | Best Vocal Performance in a Song (Female)
!style="background:#FFFF99;" ! style="width="50%" | Best Duo/Group/Collaboration Vocal Performance in a Song
|-
|
 Hasmitha Selvam – Let Love Take Over
 Gowri Arumugam – Yenggugiren
 Preeta Prasad – Sri Ragavendhira
 Shamala – Sha Na
 Thila Laxshman – Yennule Yennule
|
 Suresh Rogen & Suganya Jagathesan – Vinukku Sontham Vennila
 Dhilip Varman & Sharmila Sivaguru – Mazhaiye Vann Mazhaiye
 Jay & Thilai Laxshman – Uchi Muthal
 Sevviyal Darren & Siddarthan – Vaire Vengai
 Sidhartan & Preeta Prasad – Mana Mathure'
|-
!style="background:#FFFF99;" ! style="width="50%" | Best Folk/Gana Song
!style="background:#FFFF99;" ! style="width="50%" | Best Rock Song
|-
|
 Naa Venuma Appa Venuma – Shanthesh
 Maduraikara Panggale – Ragu,Jay & Vijeyandara Mannin Mainthargal Deepavali – Suresh Rogen, Jack(No Entry),Psycomantra,Rahna Punjabi Jeha   – Goldkartz Sollamal Varumo – Harikumar & Phycomantra|
 VMB 2.0 – Vikadakavi & Denesh
 Crystal – Casino Samba Sakthi – Boy Mj feat Hindu Ozacky Vaathiyar:The Kingdom of Janmavaram -The Villanz|-
!style="background:#FFFF99;" ! style="width="50%" | Best Hip Hop/Rap Song
!style="background:#FFFF99;" ! style="width="50%" | Best Pop/Contemporary Song
|-
|
 Scooter Vandi
 Symphony Nillevey Tamileh Swag Thamilachi Unnai Parthe Pinbu|
 Enggo Tulainthavan
 Machane Va Va Povin Odu Thendee Thendee Yennule Yennule|-
!style="background:#FFFF99;" ! style="width="50%" | Best Song in a Drama/Film
!style="background:#FFFF99;" ! style="width="50%" | Best Devotional Song
|-
|
 Maana Mathure – Anushthaana (film)
 Enggo Tulainthauan – Maduraikaran (film) Mazhaiye Vann Mazhaiye – Vilaiyaatu Pasange (film) Povin Odu – Orr Iravu (Drama) Yennule Yennule – Yaar Kutram (Drama)|
 Varam Ayyapan Sri Ragavendhira Tammarai Kanna Yenn Kural|}
 Best Engineered Album : Album Crystal by Artist Casino
 Best Music Video : Naduvan''
 Best Album Cover : Ashtaka by Wan &Reshmonu
 Best Musical Arrangement award : Boy Radge

Performers and award presenter

Performers
 Ashtaka
 Coco Nantha
 Goldkartz
 Hashmitha Selvam
 Helen Doreena
 Jay
 OG Dass
 Shruthi J
 Siddarthan
 Suresh Rogen
 Thila
 Laxshman

Presenters
 Tan Sri A K Nathan
 Allan Perera
 Asangani
 Dato’ David Arumugam
 Datuk DJ Dave
 Dato’ Ganesan
 Indi Nadarajah
 Datin Seri Manimala N. T. Rajah
 Dato’ Muthu Kumar
 Mydin Sultan
 DCP Datuk A. Paramasivam
 Tamil Selvee
 P Unnikrishnan

References

Malaysian music awards
Tamil diaspora in Malaysia